This is a list of convex, regular-faced polyhedra.  Since there are an infinite number of prisms and antiprisms, only a few have been listed.

 Convex regular
Polyhedra, convex regular